The American Board of Periodontology is an organization which serves the public and the dental profession by administering the board certification process for experts in the dental specialty of periodontics.  The board was formed in 1939 by the American Academy of Periodontology to maintain a high standard of care and advance the science and art of periodontology.  It is one of the nine specialty boards recognized by the American Dental Association.

Periodontists who have achieved board certification are awarded the title "Diplomate of the American Board of Periodontology", to demonstrate to the public that their knowledge and skills have passed this rigorous peer review process.

References

External links 
 

Dental organizations based in the United States
Medical and health organizations based in Maryland